Garrick is a hamlet in the Canadian province of Saskatchewan.

Geography 
It is in the east-central area of the province on Highway 55, east of Prince Albert.

Demographics 

References

Designated places in Saskatchewan
Organized hamlets in Saskatchewan
Torch River No. 488, Saskatchewan